Kentucky Route 1006 (KY 1006) is an  state highway in the U.S. state of Kentucky. The route is located entirely within Laurel County; the majority of the highway runs along the border of, or within the city limits of, London. KY 1006 begins at the western entrance to Levi Jackson Wilderness Road State Park and terminates at US Route 25 (US 25), KY 80, and East Fifth Street in downtown London.

Route description

The highway begins at the western entrance of Levi Jackson Wilderness Road State Park, through which the road continues as Levi Jackson Road. The route then crosses the CSX CC Subdivision before intersecting US 25. Between the park and US 25, the route is known locally as Levi Jackson Mill Road. Beyond US 25, the highway becomes known as Old Whitley Road and runs through the southwestern suburbs of London between I-75 and US 25. Approaching London, it intersects KY 363 at a roundabout before proceeding northwest toward I-75. Just east of the interstate, it intersects Kentucky Route 192, which serves as a southern bypass of London. Beyond KY 192, the highway becomes West Fifth Street and enters downtown London. The route terminates at US 25 and KY 80 adjacent to the county courthouse, although the road continues across US 25/KY 80 as East Fifth Street.

History
The roundabout with KY 363 was installed by October 20, 2015.

Major intersections

References

1006
Transportation in Laurel County, Kentucky
London, Kentucky micropolitan area